This is a list of the largest United States colleges and universities by enrollment for colleges and universities in the United States.

What this list includes:
 Colleges and universities within the United States
 University systems if the system is run under a single administration
 Enrollment is the sum of the headcount of undergraduate and graduate students
 Enrollment is counted by the Integrated Post-secondary Education System within the United States Department of Education.
 Enrollment is the 12-month unduplicated headcount, indicating the number of unique students who attended the university during the year.

What this list does not include:
 Any indication of how many of the enrolled students are full or part-time (e.g., some universities may have a high enrollment, but have most students enrolled in only a single class)
 Any indication of how many students are online-only.

For other lists that measure university enrollment, see the see also section below.

Rankings
The United States Department of Education's Integrated Post-secondary Education Data System contains information on all 6,125 officially recognized institutions of higher education in the United States. The following is a list of the ten largest institutions of higher education by Fall 2020 enrollment, meaning it is the number of unique individuals who were enrolled in at least one class on the 21st day of the Fall 2020 semester. Whether a system of individual campuses is counted as one or multiple institutions depends on how that institution is accredited and chartered. All data can be verified on the IPEDS system website.

See also
 World's largest universities
 List of largest universities by enrollment
 List of largest United States university campuses by enrollment
 List of largest United States universities by undergraduate enrollment

References

External links
Integrated Postsecondary Education Data System, U.S. Department of Education. Dataset cutting tool: All colleges and universities by enrollment count.

Enrollment
Colleges and universities by enrollment